Gröndals IK is a Swedish football club from Gröndal in South Stockholm. Since 2011 they have been playing in Division 6 Stockholm E which is the 8th tier in Swedish league football.

Season to season

Attendances

In recent seasons Gröndals IK have had the following average attendances:

Footnotes

External links
 Official site

 
Association football clubs established in 1928
Football clubs in Stockholm
1928 establishments in Sweden